"Sweet Sir Galahad" is a song written by Joan Baez that she famously performed at the Woodstock Festival in August 1969, after having debuted it during an appearance in a Season Three episode of The Smothers Brothers Comedy Hour, which aired on March 30, 1969. A recording of the song, first released as a single in late 1969, would lead off Baez's 1970 album One Day at a Time.

History 
The song tells the story of Baez's younger sister Mimi Fariña and her marriage (her second) to music producer Milan Melvin. (Mimi's first husband Richard Fariña had died in a motorcycle accident two years previously.)  Mimi and Milan were married at the 1968 Big Sur Folk Festival. Baez was inspired to write the song after hearing of Melvin's courtship of Fariña, during which he came into her bedroom at night through a window.

The song became one of Baez's best-known compositions. In her 1987 memoir And a Voice to Sing With, Baez described "Sweet Sir Galahad" as the first song she ever wrote (although she is credited as a co-writer on two tracks on her 1967 album Joan).

Mimi Fariña and Milan Melvin divorced in 1971 and Mimi died in 2001. In 2006, Baez contributed a "re-tooled" version of the song to Volume 1 of the XM Artist Confidential CD series. In the new version, Baez changed the lyric "Here's to the dawn of their days" to "Here's to the dawn of her days."

A live version of the song appears as a bonus track on the 2006 reissue of Baez's 1995 album Ring Them Bells.

A cover version was sung by Sarah Lee Guthrie (daughter of Arlo Guthrie), and may be heard on youtube.

References

Joan Baez songs
1969 songs
Songs written by Joan Baez
Vanguard Records singles